Westmoor High School is a public high school in Daly City, California, United States. It serves grades 9 through 12 as part of the Jefferson Union High School District (JUHSD). It generally serves the residents of Daly City, Pacifica, and Colma. It was recently selected as a California Distinguished School.

History
Westmoor High School was established in 1956 as the primary high school to serve the new Westlake neighborhood on the west side of Daly City.

In the school years of 2004, 2005, and 2006, Westmoor became eligible for California Distinguished School status, but was not awarded the designation until 2009. In recent years, its California Standardized Test scores have risen to an 8/10.

Throughout the years, numerous individuals, such as participants in the Civil Rights Movement and numerous California politicians, have visited Westmoor. In 2004, Democratic presidential candidate John Kerry made a campaign stop at Westmoor, speaking publicly in the main gymnasium.

Campus

The original campus building, designed by architect Mario J. Ciampi, attracted national acclaim due to its modern design elements. The building was sometimes called the "Glass Palace" due to the extensive use of architectural glass in its design.  Ciampi received an honor award from the American Institute of Architects in 1959 for his work on Westmoor. The campus is built on what was previously a pig farm and ranch.

Westmoor's main building was renovated and extended during the 2000–01 school year, and most of its original architectural and glass features were destroyed.

Demographics

According to U.S. News & World Report, 94% of Westmoor's student body is "of color", with 40% of the student body coming from economically disadvantaged households, determined by student eligibility for California's Reduced-price meal program.

Academics

Curriculum
In addition to offering the standard English, science, social science and mathematics courses, Westmoor offers Advanced Placement courses: English Language, English Literature, U.S. History, Statistics, Calculus AB, Biology, Chemistry, Physics, Studio Art, Spanish, American Government, Economics, Psychology, and European History. Westmoor's curriculum includes a variety of art and music programs such as fabric arts, ceramics, drawing and painting, general art, graphic design, as well as band, chorus, and theater arts. The foreign language department offers Spanish and French. In addition, Westmoor offers several elective courses in business, computer, and industrial art fields.  The AVID program serves to assist students, where they prepare for college and learn fundamental skills that will guide them to academic success.

Semester grading system
In the 2004–05 school year, Westmoor and other schools in the Jefferson Union High School District changed their grading periods from four quarters in two semesters per year to simply two semesters.  Student progress reports are issued each third of a semester.

Sustained Silent Reading
Westmoor began the Sustained Silent Reading (SSR) program in 2001. On a normal schedule, a twenty-minute period is designated for SSR on Tuesdays, Wednesdays, and Thursdays.  Starting in the 2005–06 school year, this period recurs on a rotating basis at the beginning of the 1st through 6th periods. During SSR, students and teachers are excluded from classwork, reading textbooks, or writing. Westmoor believes that giving students 17 minutes a day to read instead of giving them a homeroom period or study hall will improve their productivity as a student.

Standardized testing

Extracurricular activities

Clubs and organizations
Westmoor High School is home to more than 20 active clubs. All clubs are required to submit an updated Club Information Sheet to the Associated Student Body Executive Board at the beginning of the school year. The following list includes all clubs found on their website, although it is not current.

Anime Club, Anti-Bullying Club, Auto Safety Club, Bible Club, Bicycle Club, Broadcasting Club, buildOn, Burmese Club, California Scholarship Federation (CSF), Ceramics Guild, Chess Club, Dance Nation (Project A.C.E), Drama Club, Eco-Hero, Fashion Club, Future Business Leaders of America, Feminism Club, Filipino Barkada, Film Club, French Club, Key Club, Los Hermanos, Moving Mindfulness, Polynesian Club, Pride Club, Red Cross Club, Service Commission (Green Hats), Sonshine Club, SPCA Club, Speech and Debate Club, Swim Club, UNICEF Club, and Westmoor High Artistically Talented (W.H.A.T).

Student journalism/yearbook
The Rampage is the official school-sponsored newspaper at Westmoor.  It is written and published by the students of the Publications class, which also works on the school yearbook.  It is generally regarded as a high-quality publication with engaging articles and interviews with Westmoor staff and students. Articles often include relevant topics, such as recent school events and world news, as well as pieces on pop culture and debate topics in which two writers with differing opinions on certain subject matters write side by side opinion pieces. It is published on the school website.  The Rampage produced its first and only issue of the 2004–05 school year in October 2004, although it had several more issues planned that were never published before the end of the school year. In the 2013-2014 year, however, it published five issues, more than any years previous, due to a change in editing staff.

Athletics

Westmoor is a member of the Central Coast Section (CCS) and competes in the Peninsula Athletic League (PAL). The school was a member of the North Coast Section from 1957 to 1965, when the Central Coast Section was created. They competed in the Peninsula League from 1957 to 1961, along with more established schools in San Mateo County such as Aragon, Burlingame, Capuchino, Hillsdale, Mills, Jefferson, San Mateo, and South San Francisco. From 1961 to 1995, Westmoor competed in the North Peninsula League (NPL), along with El Camino, Half Moon Bay, Jefferson, Oceana, Serramonte, South San Francisco, and Terra Nova. In 1996, the NPL and PAL merged, making the PAL a super-league. However, PAL is split into two divisions: Bay and Ocean.

The school once fielded boys football, girls softball, boys wrestling, girls gymnastics, and boys golf.

Football 
The football program at Westmoor was dropped in April 1996 by then Principal Gary Johnson due to financial hardships and low participation. At the end of the 1995 season, the team did not have a winning season in 10 years and had not beaten their rival, Jefferson High, in 13 years.  The team made two CCS playoff appearances in 1972 and 1982, and won the league title in 1972.

The team played its last season in the 1995 and finished 2–7 overall, 1–5 in league play. Throughout the season, the team struggled, losing players due to injuries and grades, resulting in an average of 20 players suiting up each game.

Westmoor's football team had only four coaches in its history. Pete Matisi coached the team from its beginning from 1957 to 1981, when he retired. Ken Cook took over the program 1982–1988, coming over from the closure of Serramonte High School. Dan Ramirez coached the team in 1989 and Mike Williams coached the team in 1990 and 1991. Darryl Kennedy coached the last three years of the program from 1992 to 1995.

Westmoor's main football rival was Jefferson High School. Their game was dubbed by newspapers as the Daly City Bowl or the Greater Daly City–Colma Chamber of Commerce Trophy Game. Jefferson won the first meeting between the two teams in 1957, 32–12. Westmoor took the trophy from 1958 to 1967 and from 1969 to 1977. Jefferson won the annual game from 1978 to 1981, 1983 to 1986, and 1988 to 1995. There were two ties in the 39-year history: in 1968 and 1987. Westmoor still holds the overall lead in the rivalry with a record of 20–17–2.

Notable alumni

Greg Adams, 1970, trumpeter and musician best known as an original member of the soul band Tower of Power
 Brett Barron, 1977, member of the 1984 US Olympic judo team that won 5 gold medals and 5 bronze medals in the US National Championships
 Bren Bataclan, 1988, Cambridge-based visual artist 
 Leo Biedermann, 1973, former NFL player for the Cleveland Browns
 Efrain Burgos Jr., 2004, professional soccer player for Chalatenango
 Jacki R. Chan, 1998, actress, model, musician
 Michael Guingona, 1980, four-term Mayor of Daly City
 DJ Apollo, 1986, turntablist and DJ who pioneered turntablism with the Invisibl Skratch Piklz
 Anthony Improgo, 1994, drummer for the band Metro Station
 H.P. Mendoza, writer, director, and composer, best known for Colma: The Musical, a musical featuring characters who are recent Westmoor graduates
 Mix Master Mike, real name Michael Schwartz, dropped out in 1986, turntablist, DJ for the Beastie Boys
 Ed Montague, 1966, MLB umpire
 Dave Pelzer, 1978, author, best known for A Child Called "It"
 José Solano, 1989, actor, best known for his role as Manny Gutierrez on Baywatch
 Tom Torlakson, 1967, California State Senator (2000–2008), California State Assemblymember (1996–2000, 2008–2010), California State Superintendent of Public Instruction, 2011–2019
 REI, 2011, singer/songwriter and musician for J-rock band One Eye Closed known for signing with JPU Records and their works with video games No Straight Roads and UNBEATABLE

See also
San Mateo County high schools

References

External links

 Westmoor High School website

Jefferson Union High School District schools
Educational institutions established in 1956
High schools in San Mateo County, California
Public high schools in California
1956 establishments in California